Chittani Ramachandra Hegde (1 January 1933 – 3 October 2017) was a Yakshagana artist from Honnavara, Uttara Kannada, Karnataka. He was the first Yakshagana artist to be awarded the Padma Shri Award by the Government of India.

About

Chittani Ramachandra Hegde is the first Yakshagana artist to win the prestigious Padmashri award before winning several awards in Karnataka. His style is so popular that it is called Chittani Gharana. He started his Yakshagana career when he was just 7 years old, after dropping out of School when he was still studying in II Standard. He started performing in main roles when he was just 14 years old and performed on stage until a few days preceding his death in October 2017. He hailed from Uttara Kannada district and is popularly known as Chittani among his huge fan base.

Life
Chittani Ramachandra Hegde was born in the Uttara Kannada district of Karnataka. He practised badaguthittu style of Yakshagana. In spite of stiff resistance from family members, he started giving Yakshagana performances at the age of 15 and continued to act till age 83, a few days before his death.

Yakshagana performances
Chittani perfected the Yakshagana performance to such a level, where he is considered as "the finest example of what one could achieve in life with hard work and achievements". Chittani had performed Yakshagana all over India and abroad. He used to perform on stage better than any younger artists. The ever lasting concrete experience on stage has enabled him to master even the most vigorous and tough character of the art, he added. He had even earned praise and appreciation from the legend of Kannada cinema the late Dr Rajkumar.

Chittani and Yakshagana
Chittani Ramachandra Hegde is one of the few names that Badaguthittu brings to mind. The Badagu style of Yakshagana is the coming together of dialogue, dance and acting. When all the three aspects are in the right proportion, the character that is portrayed comes out as required. This style of Yakshagana provides a great scope for the growth of the character portrayed. In fact Yakshagana is one art that provides a huge canvas for the characters to come to life. Probably no other art form offers that scope. As a result, the growth of the artiste means the growth of the character and hence the growth of the art itself.

Wearing anklets on his feet and having dedicated more than six decades of his life to Yakshagana, Chittani was an artist of very high calibre. Chittani knew no world other than Yakshagana. Even at his ripe old age, not a single day was complete without Chittani tying anklets to his feet for the dance. Chittani was also known for his generous and encouraging attitude especially towards his fellow artists.

Chittani grew up to the sounds of the Chande and Maddale. Yakshagana is very active through the year in North and South Canara and Shimoga district. Chittani, influenced by this environment since childhood, gave up his studies after class two and ever since has devoted all his time towards learning and perfecting the art of Yakshagana. Having learnt the intricacies of the art from a number of troupes and artistes like Shivarama Hegde and Kondadakuli Rama Hegde, Chittani soon rose to the level of playing the lead roles. Whichever troupe that Chittani became part of, had nothing to worry about as all the shows ran to packed houses whenever Chittani performed. It would not amount to exaggeration if one were to say that Chittani was the only 'box office hero' in the history of Yakshagana.

According to his fans, some of the characters portrayed by Chittani have actually been created by him. Bhasmasura-Mohini's Bhasmasura, Gadhayudda's Kaurava, Sudhanvarjuna's Arjuna as well as Sudhanva, Keechaka, Jarasandha, Karthaveeryarjuna, Dushtabuddhi, Maghagada, kamsa, kaladara, Rudrakopa among others, are characters which he mastered. He has grown with the characters he portrayed and the characters too have grown with him. Chittani was more of an entertaining artist.

With his performances, he drew a fan following which included Kannada stars like Dr.Raj Kumar, Uday Kumar and Sreenath. Uday Kumar, who was known for his negative roles, would attend 'all-night' Yakshagana performances at the Town Hall in Bengaluru to study Chittani's expressions. Some of the expressions enacted by Yakshagana artists are known after Chittani.

Mantapa Prabhakara Upadhya, Yakshagana artiste, described Chittani as a man who had taught him humility and the need to respect even the person who bought the cheapest ticket for a show. "He once told me that one should put on banna (make-up) as if it was one's last performance. That is the highest philosophy I have learnt from Chittani", said Upadhya.

The kind of life that Chittani had breathed into the character of Bhasmasura while performing on stage was unparalleled. The portrayal of the character of Bhasmasura was extraordinary. Chittani's greatest plus points were his dancing and acting abilities, it was his presentation of anger, shringara or fear, that brought him to the forefront. His two sons, Subramanya Chittani and Narasimha Chittani, are already following in the footsteps of their father and pursuing the art.

First Padmashri award for Yakshagana
Chittani Ramachandra Hegde is the first artist performing Yakshagana, to receive prestigious Padmashri award and he dedicated the award to "Yakshagana".

Gallery

Death
Chittani Ramachandra Hegde fell ill with pneumonia on 29 September 2017, and died on 3 October 2017 at Manipal Hospital.

Awards
 Padma Shri award in 2012, by Ministry of Home affairs, Government of India.
 K. Shivaram Karanth award in 2009, by Kotathattu grama panchayat, Karnataka.
 Janapadashri Award in 2004.
 Keremane Shivarama Hegde Award in 2013.
 Rajyotsava Prashasti award in 1991.
 Karki Venkataramana Shastri Suri Award in 2009
 Aryabhata International Award for immense contribution in field of Yakshagana
 Alva's Nudisiri Award in 2012
 Astana kalavida Prashasti in 2009 from Udupi Krishna Matt

Admirers
Week long Yakshagana performances in his name, styled "Chittani Yaksha Sambhrama" are conducted by his admirers at Mangalore every year.

References

1933 births
2017 deaths
Yakshagana
Recipients of the Padma Shri in arts
Deaths from pneumonia in India